The San Antonio Stakes is an American Thoroughbred horse race held at Santa Anita Park in Arcadia, California. Raced on the dirt, it is for horses age three and older. In 2017, the distance was shortened from  miles to  miles. The race was originally run under handicap conditions but is now run under allowance weight conditions, with specified weight reductions for horses who meet certain conditions. The San Antonio has been a Grade II event since 1990. The current purse is $200,000.

The San Antonio was traditionally run in February and was frequently used as a prep race for the Santa Anita Handicap. In 2017, the race was run once in February, and then again on December 26, the opening day of the Santa Anita winter-spring meet. With its new position in the stakes calendar, the race now serves as a prep for the Pegasus World Cup.

Inaugurated in 1935, the San Antonio Handicap was run at a mile and a sixteenth in 1940 and 1941.

Records
Speed record:
  miles – 1:46.20 – Vigors (1978)
  miles – 1:42.55 – Hoppertunity (2017)

Most wins:
 2 - Gun Bow (1964, 1965)
 2 - Gentlemen (1997, 1998)
 2 - Game On Dude (2012, 2013)
 2- Hoppertunity (2016, 2017)
2- Gift Box (2018,2019)

Most wins by a jockey:
 7 - Bill Shoemaker (1951, 1953, 1960, 1964, 1967, 1971, 1985)

Most wins by a trainer:
 7 - Bob Baffert (2003, 2010, 2012, 2013, 2016, 2017, 2022)
 7 - Richard Mandella (1984, 1995, 1997, 1998, 2002, 2004, 2006)

Most wins by an owner:
 4 - Calumet Farm (1950, 1951, 1954, 1990)

Winners

References

 The 2009 San Antonio Handicap at the NTRA

Horse races in California
Santa Anita Park
Graded stakes races in the United States
Flat horse races for four-year-olds
Open mile category horse races
Recurring sporting events established in 1935
1935 establishments in California